Lincoln County Airport  is a county-owned, public-use airport in Lincoln County, Nevada, United States. It is located two nautical miles (4 km) west of the central business district of Panaca, Nevada. It is within the Desert MOA associated with Nellis Air Force Base: the MOA begins 1500 feet above the airfield. 

The National Plan of Integrated Airport Systems for 2011–2015 categorized it as a general aviation facility.

Facilities and aircraft 
Lincoln County Airport covers an area of 190 acres (77 ha) at an elevation of 4,831 feet (1,472 m) above mean sea level. It has one runway designated 17/35 with an asphalt surface measuring 4,606 by 60 feet (1,404 x 18 m).

For the 12-month period ending January 31, 2011, the airport had 1,000 general aviation aircraft operations, an average of 83 per month. At that time there were three aircraft based at this airport: 67% single-engine and 33% ultralight.

Road access to the airport is provided by Nevada State Route 816, which connects the airport to U.S. Route 93.

See also 
 List of airports in Nevada

References

External links 
  from Nevada DOT
 Aerial image as of April 1994 from USGS The National Map
 

Airports in Nevada
Transportation in Lincoln County, Nevada
Buildings and structures in Lincoln County, Nevada